Catherine Salvaresso, or Ecaterina Salvaresso (died 1590 in Tripoli) was a princess consort of Wallachia. She was married to Alexandru II Mircea and was the mother of Mihnea Turcitul. She was the regent of Wallachia during the minority of her son from 1577 until 1583.

Salvaresso was from a Catholic Italian family and a resident of the Italian quarter in Constantinople, where she met Alexandru II Mircea during his pilgrimage. They married in Pera in 1558, and she converted to the Orthodox faith. She founded the convent Slătioarele and imported to first printing press in Bucharest in 1573. In 1577, her spouse died and she became the regent of her son, who was at that time a hostage of the Ottomans.

Sources 
Ileana Cazan, Eugen Denize: Marile puteri și spațiul românesc în secolele XV-XVI, Editura Universității din București, 2001
Gh.T. Ionescu: Nou despre doamna Ecaterina Salvaresso a Țării Românești, în Istros, VII, Brăila, 1994, p.189-199.

1590 deaths
16th-century women rulers
Regents and governors of Wallachia
16th-century Romanian people
Royal consorts of Wallachia
Place of birth missing
Year of birth unknown
Members of the Romanian Orthodox Church
Converts to Eastern Orthodoxy from Roman Catholicism
Eastern Orthodox Christians from Italy
16th-century Romanian women